SIGPLAN is the Association for Computing Machinery's Special Interest Group on programming languages.

Conferences
 Principles of Programming Languages (POPL)
 Programming Language Design and Implementation (PLDI)
 International Symposium on Memory Management (ISMM)
 Languages, Compilers, and Tools for Embedded Systems (LCTES)
 Symposium on Principles and Practice of Parallel Programming (PPoPP)
 International Conference on Functional Programming (ICFP)
 Systems, Programming, Languages, and Applications: Software for Humanity (SPLASH)
 Object-Oriented Programming, Systems, Languages, and Applications (OOPSLA)
 History of Programming Languages (HOPL)
 Dynamic Languages Symposium (DLS)

Associated journals
 ACM Transactions on Architecture and Code Optimization
 ACM Transactions on Programming Languages and Systems
 Proceedings of the ACM on Programming Languages

Newsletters
 SIGPLAN Notices -   - Home page at ACM
 Fortran Forum -  
 Lisp Pointers (final issue 1995) - 
 OOPS Messenger (1990–1996) -

Awards

Programming Languages Software Award
 2022: CompCert
 2021: WebAssembly
 2020: Pin (computer program)
 2019: Scala (programming language)
 2018: Racket (programming language)
 2016: V8 (JavaScript engine)
 2015: Z3 Theorem Prover
 2014: GNU Compiler Collection (GCC)
 2013: Coq proof assistant
 2012: Jikes Research Virtual Machine (RVM)
 2011: Simon Peyton Jones and Simon Marlow (Glasgow Haskell Compiler)
 2010: Chris Lattner (LLVM)

Programming Languages Achievement Award
Recognizes an individual or individuals who has made a significant and lasting contribution to the field of programming languages.
 2020: Hans-J. Boehm
 2019: Alex Aiken
 2017: Thomas W. Reps
 2016: Simon Peyton Jones
 2015: Luca Cardelli
 2014: Neil D. Jones
 2013: Patrick Cousot and Radhia Cousot
 2012: Matthias Felleisen
 2011: Tony Hoare
 2010: Gordon Plotkin
 2009: Rod Burstall
 2008: Barbara Liskov
 2007: Niklaus Wirth
 2006: Ron Cytron, Jeanne Ferrante, Barry K. Rosen, Mark Wegman, and Kenneth Zadeck
 2005: Erich Gamma, Richard Helm, Ralph Johnson, John Vlissides
 2004: John Backus
 2003: John C. Reynolds
 2002: John McCarthy
 2001: Robin Milner
 2000: Susan Graham
 1999: Ken Kennedy
 1998: Fran Allen
 1997: Guy Steele

Robin Milner Young Researcher Award
Recognizes outstanding contributions by young researchers in the area of programming languages. The award is named after the computer scientist Robin Milner.
 2019: Martin Vechev
 2018: Ranjit Jhala
 2017: Derek Dreyer
 2016: Stephanie Weirich
 2015: David Walker
 2014: Sumit Gulwani
 2013: Lars Birkedal
 2012: Shriram Krishnamurthi

SIGPLAN Doctoral Dissertation Award
The full name of this award is the John C. Reynolds Doctoral Dissertation Award, after the computer scientist John C. Reynolds. It is "presented annually to the author of the outstanding doctoral dissertation in the area of Programming Languages."
 2018: Justin Hsu and David Menendez
 2017: Ramana Kumar
 2016: Shachar Itzhaky and Vilhelm Sjöberg
 2015: Mark Batty
 2014: Aaron Turon
 2013: Patrick Rondon
 2012: Dan Marino
 2010: Robert L. Bocchino
 2009: Akash Lai and William Thies
 2008: Michael Bond and Viktor Vafeiadis
 2007: Swarat Chaudhuri
 2006: Xiangyu Zhang
 2005: Sumit Gulwani
 2003: Godmar Back
 2002: Michael Hicks
 2001: Rastislav Bodik

SIGPLAN Distinguished Service Award
 2016: Phil Wadler
 2015: Dan Grossman
 2014: Simon Peyton Jones
 2013: Kathleen Fisher
 2012: Jens Palsberg
 2011: Kathryn S. McKinley
 2010: Jack W. Davidson
 2009: Mamdouh Ibrahim
 2008: Michael Burke
 2007: Linda M. Northrop
 2006: Hans  Boehm
 2005: no award made
 2004: Ron Cytron
 2003: Mary Lou Soffa
 2002: Andrew Appel
 2001: Barbara G. Ryder
 2000: David Wise
 1999: Loren Meissner
 1998: Brent Hailpern
 1997: J.A.N. Lee and Jean E. Sammet
 1996: Dick Wexelblat and John Richards

Most Influential PLDI Paper Award
 2017 (for 2007): Valgrind: a framework for heavyweight dynamic binary instrumentation, Nicholas Nethercote, Julian Seward
 2016 (for 2006): DieHard: probabilistic memory safety for unsafe languages, Emery Berger, Benjamin Zorn
 2015 (for 2005): Pin: building customized program analysis tools with dynamic instrumentation, Chi-Keung Luk, Robert Cohn, Robert Muth, Harish Patil, Artur Klauser, Geoff Lowney, Steven Wallace, Vijay Janapa Reddi, and Kim Hazelwood 
 2014 (for 2004): Scalable Lock-Free Dynamic Memory Allocation, Maged M. Michael
 2013 (for 2003): The nesC language: A holistic approach to networked embedded systems, David Gay, Philip Levis, J. Robert von Behren, Matt Welsh, Eric Brewer, and David E. Culler
 2012 (for 2002): Extended Static Checking for Java, Cormac Flanagan, K. Rustan M. Leino, Mark Lillibridge, Greg Nelson, James B. Saxe, and Raymie Stata 
 2011 (for 2001): Automatic predicate abstraction of C programs, Thomas Ball, Rupak Majumdar, Todd Millstein, and Sriram K. Rajamani
 2010 (for 2000): Dynamo: A Transparent Dynamic Optimization System, Vasanth Bala, Evelyn Duesterwald, Sanjeev Banerji
 2009 (for 1999): A Fast Fourier Transform Compiler, Matteo Frigo
 2008 (for 1998): The implementation of the Cilk-5 multithreaded language, Matteo Frigo, Charles E. Leiserson, Keith H. Randall
 2007 (for 1997): Exploiting hardware performance counters with flow and context sensitive profiling, Glenn Ammons, Thomas Ball, and James R. Larus
 2006 (for 1996): TIL: A Type-Directed Optimizing Compiler for ML, David Tarditi, Greg Morrisett, Perry Cheng, Christopher Stone, Robert Harper, and Peter Lee
 2005 (for 1995): Selective Specialization for Object-Oriented Languages, Jeffrey Dean, Craig Chambers, and David Grove
 2004 (for 1994): ATOM: a system for building customized program analysis tools, Amitabh Srivastava and Alan Eustace
 2003 (for 1993): Space Efficient Conservative Garbage Collection, Hans  Boehm
 2002 (for 1992): Lazy Code Motion, Jens Knoop, Oliver Rüthing, Bernhard Steffen
 2001 (for 1991): A data locality optimizing algorithm, Michael E. Wolf and Monica S. Lam
 2000 (for 1990): Profile guided code positioning, Karl Pettis and Robert C. Hansen

Most Influential POPL Paper Award
 2018 (for 2008): Multiparty asynchronous session types, Kohei Honda, Nobuko Yoshida, Marco Carbone
 2017 (for 2007): JavaScript Instrumentation for Browser Security, Dachuan Yu, Ajay Chander, Nayeem Islam, Igor Serikov
 2016 (for 2006): Formal certification of a compiler back-end or: programming a compiler with a proof assistant, Xavier Leroy
 2015 (for 2005): Combinators for Bidirectional Tree Transformations: A Linguistic Approach to the View Update Problem, Nate Foster, Michael B. Greenwald, Jonathan T. Moore, Benjamin C. Pierce, Alan Schmitt 
 2014 (for 2004): Abstractions from proofs,  Thomas Henzinger, Ranjit Jhala, Rupak Majumdar, Kenneth McMillan
 2013 (for 2003): A real-time garbage collector with low overhead and consistent utilization, David F. Bacon, Perry Cheng, VT Rajan
 2012 (for 2002): CCured: Type-Safe Retrofitting of Legacy Code, George C. Necula, Scott McPeak, and Westley Weimer
 2011 (for 2001): BI as an Assertion Language for Mutable Data Structures, Samin Ishtiaq and Peter W. O'Hearn
 2010 (for 2000): Anytime, Anywhere: Modal Logics for Mobile Ambients, Luca Cardelli and Andrew D. Gordon
 2009 (for 1999): JFlow: Practical Mostly-Static Information Flow Control, Andrew C. Myers
 2008 (for 1998): From System F to Typed Assembly Language, Greg Morrisett, David Walker, Karl Crary, and Neal Glew
 2007 (for 1997): Proof-carrying Code, George Necula
 2006 (for 1996): Points-to Analysis in Almost Linear Time, Bjarne Steensgaard
 2005 (for 1995): A Language with Distributed Scope, Luca Cardelli
 2004 (for 1994): Implementation of the Typed Call-by-Value lambda-calculus using a Stack of Regions, Mads Tofte and Jean-Pierre Talpin
 2003 (for 1993): Imperative functional programming, Simon Peyton Jones and Philip Wadler

Most Influential OOPSLA Paper Award
 2017 (for 2007): Statistically Rigorous Java Performance Evaluation, Andy Georges, Dries Buytaert, Lieven Eeckhout
 2016 (for 2006): The DaCapo benchmarks: Java benchmarking development and analysis, Stephen M. Blackburn, Robin Garner, Chris Hoffmann, Asjad M. Khan, Kathryn S. McKinley, Rotem Bentzur, Amer Diwan, Daniel Feinberg, Daniel Frampton, Samuel Z. Guyer, Martin Hirzel, Antony Hosking, Maria Jump, Han Lee, J. Eliot B. Moss, Aashish Phansalkar, Darko Stefanović, Thomas VanDrunen, Daniel von Dincklage, Ben Wiedermann
 2015 (for 2005): X10: An Object-Oriented Approach to Non-Uniform Cluster Computing, Philippe Charles, Christian Grothoff, Vijay Saraswat, Christopher Donawa, Allan Kielstra, Kemal Ebcioglu, Christoph von Praun, and Vivek Sarkar
 2014 (for 2004): Mirrors: Design Principles for Meta-level Facilities of Object-Oriented Programming Languages, Gilad Bracha and David Ungar
 2013 (for 2003): Language Support for Lightweight Transactions, Tim Harris and Keir Fraser
 2012 (for 2002): Reconsidering Custom Memory Allocation, Emery D. Berger, Benjamin G. Zorn, and Kathryn S. McKinley
 2010 (for 2000): Adaptive Optimization in the Jalapeño JVM, Matthew Arnold, Stephen Fink, David Grove, Michael Hind, and Peter F. Sweeney
 2009 (for 1999): Implementing Jalapeño in Java, Bowen Alpern, C. R. Attanasio, John J. Barton, Anthony Cocchi, Susan Flynn Hummel, Derek Lieber, Ton Ngo, Mark Mergen, Janice C. Shepherd, and Stephen Smith
 2008 (for 1998): Ownership Types for Flexible Alias Protection, David G. Clarke, John M. Potter, and James Noble
 2007 (for 1997): Call Graph Construction in Object-Oriented Languages, David Grove, Greg DeFouw, Jeffrey Dean, and Craig Chambers
 2006 (for 1986–1996):
 Subject Oriented Programming: A Critique of Pure Objects, William Harrison and Harold Ossher
 Concepts and Experiments in Computational Reflection, Pattie Maes
 Self: The Power of Simplicity, David Ungar and Randall B. Smith

Most Influential ICFP Paper Award
 2019 (for 2009): Runtime Support for Multicore Haskell: Simon Marlow, Simon Peyton Jones, and Satnam Singh
 2009 (for 1999): Haskell and XML: Generic combinators or type-based translation?, Malcolm Wallace and Colin Runciman
 2008 (for 1998): Cayenne — a language with dependent types, Lennart Augustsson
 2007 (for 1997): Functional Reactive Animation, Conal Elliott and Paul Hudak
 2006 (for 1996): Optimality and inefficiency: what isn't a cost model of the lambda calculus?, Julia L. Lawall and Harry G. Mairson

See also

 List of computer science awards

References

External links
SIGPLAN homepage

Association for Computing Machinery Special Interest Groups